United Nations Security Council resolution 1232, adopted unanimously on 30 March 1999, after reaffirming all previous resolutions on the question of the Western Sahara, the Council extended the mandate of the United Nations Mission for the Referendum in Western Sahara (MINURSO) until 30 April 1999.

The Security Council extended MINURSO's mandate to allow for an understanding between Morocco, the Polisario Front and United Nations concerning implementation of the voter identification and appeals protocols and to continue talks on the return of refugees, welcoming the resumption of pre-registration activities by the United Nations High Commissioner for Refugees in Tindouf, Algeria. It welcomed an agreement between the Moroccan government and MINURSO Force Commander on mines and unexploded ordnance.

Finally, the Secretary-General Kofi Annan was instructed to submit a report by 23 April 1999 on the implementation of the current resolution.

See also
 Free Zone (region)
 History of Western Sahara
 List of United Nations Security Council Resolutions 1201 to 1300 (1998–2000)
 Sahrawi Arab Democratic Republic
 Moroccan Western Sahara Wall

References

External links
 
Text of the Resolution at undocs.org

 1232
1999 in Morocco
 1232
 1232
March 1999 events
1999 in Western Sahara